West Virginia Route 37 is an east–west state highway in western West Virginia. The western terminus of the route is at the Kentucky state line in Fort Gay, where WV 37 becomes Kentucky Route 3 Spur upon crossing the Tug Fork. The eastern terminus is at West Virginia Route 10 one mile (1.6 km) south of Ranger.

History
A large portion of WV 37 was relocated in eastern Wayne County about 1970 as a result of the construction of East Lynn Lake, which flooded the route's former path along East Fork Twelvepole Creek.  The highway was relocated up a series of side valleys from just downstream of the dam to near Kiahsville.  East of Kiahsville, the road was moved to a higher elevation out of the lake's floodplain.

Major intersections

References

037
Transportation in Lincoln County, West Virginia
Transportation in Wayne County, West Virginia